Kensett is a city in Worth County, Iowa, United States. The population was 257 at the time of the 2020 census. It is part of the Mason City Micropolitan Statistical Area.

History
Kensett was platted in 1872 shortly after the railroad was built through that territory in 1871.

Geography
Kensett is located at  (43.353859, -93.208560).

Demographics

2010 census
At the 2010 census there were 266 people in 125 households, including 77 families, in the city. The racial makup of the city was 98.1% White, 1.1% Asian, 0.4% from other races, and 0.4% from two or more races. Hispanic or Latino of any race were 0.8%.

Of the 125 households 16.8% had children under the age of 18 living with them, 47.2% were married couples living together, 9.6% had a female householder with no husband present, 4.8% had a male householder with no wife present, and 38.4% were non-families. 32.8% of households were one person and 14.4% were one person aged 65 or older. The average household size was 2.13 and the average family size was 2.60.

The median age was 50.3 years. 15% of residents were under the age of 18; 6.5% were between the ages of 18 and 24; 21.4% were from 25 to 44; 36.5% were from 45 to 64; and 20.7% were 65 or older. The gender makeup of the city was 49.6% male and 50.4% female.

2000 census
As of the census of 2000, there were 280 people in 131 households, including 77 families, in the city. The racial makup of the city was 100.00% White.

Of the 131 households 19.8% had children under the age of 18 living with them, 51.1% were married couples living together, 4.6% had a female householder with no husband present, and 40.5% were non-families. 35.1% of households were one person and 18.3% were one person aged 65 or older. The average household size was 2.14 and the average family size was 2.67.

The age distribution was 20.0% under the age of 18, 7.5% from 18 to 24, 26.8% from 25 to 44, 26.8% from 45 to 64, and 18.9% 65 or older. The median age was 44 years. For every 100 females, there were 101.4 males. For every 100 females age 18 and over, there were 100.0 males.

The median household income was $30,500 and the median family income  was $40,000. Males had a median income of $29,000 versus $20,179 for females. The per capita income for the city was $15,601. About 14.3% of families and 17.2% of the population were below the poverty line, including 35.1% of those under the age of eighteen and 14.0% of those sixty five or over.

Education
The Northwood-Kensett Community School District operates local area public schools.

References

Cities in Iowa
Cities in Worth County, Iowa
Mason City, Iowa micropolitan area